The Surfside Vykruta Jetty Trail  is a 4300' long man-made jetty constructed primarily of large granite slabs located in the SE tip of Surfside Beach, Texas. The jetty extends 3464' into the Gulf of Mexico and protects the Freeport Harbor Channel. The trailhead is accessible from the Surfside Jetty County Park, a 15-acre day use beach park.

Walkway and lighthouse 
The jetty is covered with a concrete walkway for easy access by foot. The jetty is earmarked with a small lighthouse at the outermost section.

Recreational Activities

Fishing

The jetty frequented by fishermen, during daytime and night when assisted with large, gas generator powered flood lights to attract fish. Dozens of fisherman gather daily to catch red drum, speckled trout, spanish mackerel and other species.

Surfing

Surfing is popular just north of the jetty; surfers travel hours for the excellent surfing.

Photography, drone photography, bird watching 

The Vykruta Jetty Trail is popular for photography and drone photography and seabird watching. Jetty Trail End

References

Buildings and structures in Brazoria County, Texas